Tord Sahlén (born 17 May 1937) is a Swedish sprint canoer who competed in the mid to late 1960s. He won a silver medal in the K-2 10000 m event at the 1963 ICF Canoe Sprint World Championships in Jajce.

Sahlén also finished fourth in the K-4 1000 m event at the 1968 Summer Olympics in Mexico City.

References

Sports-reference.com profile

1937 births
Canoeists at the 1968 Summer Olympics
Living people
Olympic canoeists of Sweden
Swedish male canoeists
ICF Canoe Sprint World Championships medalists in kayak